The Wadsworth Memorial Handicap is a Thoroughbred race for horses three years old and older of either gender set at a distance of one and one eighth miles on the dirt.  Run at Finger Lakes Race Track  on the 4th of July each year (the track is 46 years old in 2007), the Wadsworth is an ungraded stakes race offering a purse of $50,000.

In 2007, in order to attract the dual classic winner (Kentucky Derby & Preakness Stakes), Funny Cide, to the 31st running of the Wadsworth, Finger Lake Race Track raised the purse to $100,000.

The Wadsworth will be in its 35th running in 2010.

Past winners

2009 - Sweetnorthernsaint (John Davila Jr.)
2008 - Rises the Phoenix
2007 – Funny Cide (Alan Garcia) (1:51.77)
2006 – Johnie Bye Night
2005 - Sinister G
2004 - Dulce de Leche (Joe Badamo)
2003 - Right Stop
2002 - Toddler
2001 - Woodwork
2000 - Turbulent Spirit, Salish Prince - (dead heat)
1999 - Missionary Monk
1998 - Cherokee Reef
1997 - C B Account
1996 - Rosie's Buddy
1995 - Le Frisky
1994 - Baron Von Blixen
1993 - Dangerous Dawn
1992 - Dangerous Dawn
1991 - Brave Beast
1990 - Sea Hunter
1989 - Matthew's Moment
1988 - Lord Penguin
1987 - Lord Penguin
1986 - Spruce Arrow
1985 - Last Tactic
1984 - Org
1982 - The Boy Mikey
1981 - Captain Pat
1980 - Fio Rito
1979 - Helpful Henry
1978 - Bout
1975 - Sole Image
1974 - Nashem Bay

External links
 Finger Lakes Gaming and Race Track

Ungraded stakes races in the United States
Horse races in the United States
Open mile category horse races
1974 establishments in New York (state)
Recurring sporting events established in 1974